The National Alliance was a political party in the island of Saint Lucia led by George Odlum. It contested the 2001 general elections, but received only 3.7% of the vote and failed to win a seat.

References

Political parties in Saint Lucia